Love Cavalcade is a 1940 French film directed by Raymond Bernard and written by Jean Anouilh.

Plot
Three episodes show how the owners of a certain French castle experience dramatic issues with their love interests. The plot spans three centuries.

Cast
Claude Dauphin : Léandre, Hubert & Georges 
Michel Simon :  Diogène, Monseigneur de Beaupré & Lacouret 
Janine Darcey : Julie 
Simone Simon : Juliette  
Corinne Luchaire : Junie
 Saturnin Fabre : Lacouret
 Alfred Baillou : Un comédien
 Charles Vissières : Le maître d'hôtel
 Marcel Melrac : L'employé du gaz
 Jacques Castelot : Un danseur
 Pierre Labry : Le baron de Maupré
 Trubsky : Le marquis de Longuyon
 Henri Richard : Anthelme
 Christian Argentin : Le chapelin
 Henri Monteux : Joseph
 Hubert Daix : an actor
 Blanchette Brunoy : Léonie de Maupré
 Dorville : father of Junie
 Léon Larive : cook
 Milly Mathis : nurse

Music
Music for the film was composed by Roger Désormière, Arthur Honegger, and Darius Milhaud. Milhaud later adapted his music for La cheminée du roi René for wind quintet.

References

External links

1940 films
1940 romantic drama films
1940s French-language films
French black-and-white films
Films directed by Raymond Bernard
Films produced by Arnold Pressburger
Films scored by Darius Milhaud
Films scored by Arthur Honegger
Films with screenplays by Jean Anouilh
Films with screenplays by Jean Aurenche
French romantic drama films
1940s French films